Jacob Michailovitch Gordin (Yiddish: יעקב מיכאַילאָװיטש גאָרדין; May 1, 1853 – June 11, 1909) was a Russian-born American playwright active in the early years of Yiddish theater. He is known for introducing realism and naturalism into Yiddish theater.

The Cambridge History of English and American Literature characterizes him as "the acknowledged reformer of the Yiddish stage." At the time of his rise, professional Yiddish theater was still dominated by the spirit of the early (1886–1888) plays of its founder, Abraham Goldfaden, which derived in no small measure from Purim plays, often spectacles more than dramas; Goldfaden's later works were generally operettas on more serious subjects, perhaps edifying, but not naturalistic. Again quoting the Cambridge History, after his 1892 arrival in New York City, "Gordin took the Yiddish drama in America from the realm of the preposterous and put a living soul into it," bringing it up to the level of "realistic melodrama."

Life and career
Gordin was born in Myrhorod, Ukraine, Russian Empire, and received a liberal though irregular education at home.  He was recognized as a reformer and a  Russian writer. He had also been a farmer, a journalist, a shipyard worker in Odessa, and, reportedly, an actor.

He migrated to New York in July 1891, and tried to make a living writing for Russian-language newspapers and the Yiddish socialist Arbayter Tsaytung (the precursor to the Forverts, The Forward), but his acquaintanceship with the noted Jewish actors Jacob Adler and Sigmund Mogulesko prompted him to try his hand at play-writing.

His first play, Siberia, was based on a true story about a man sent as a prisoner to Siberia and who escaped, lived out a normal life for many years, and was then exiled again. Although initially it met a rocky reception (as did his second play, Two Worlds), it was a critical success. His third play The Pogrom in Russia was produced in January 1892 by the actor Boris Thomashefsky. In June 1892, Gordin signed a contract with Jacob Pavlovich Adler, and later that year, for Adler and his troupe, he wrote Der yidisher kenig lir (The Jewish King Lear), loosely adapted from Shakespeare  and the Russian writer Ivan Turgenev's King Lear of the Steppes, and set in 19th century Russia. It laid the foundation of his career as a Yiddish playwright. The play drew a new audience of Russian-Jewish intellectuals to the Yiddish theater and constituted a defining moment in Adler's career as well as Gordin's. It is widely seen as ushering in the first "Golden Age" of Yiddish theater in New York.

To some extent he had to compromise his modernist vision with the theatrical conventions of the time. As in the plays of Goldfaden, Moses Horowitz (Hurvitz), and Joseph Lateiner, dancing and songs unrelated to the plot still occupied a prominent part in the play, but Gordin's plots were naturalistic and the characters were living persons. Under the influence of his plays, Jewish actors began to regard their profession as one which calls for study and an earnest attitude.

Gordin is noted more for bringing naturalism and realism into the Yiddish theater than as an intrinsically great dramatist. Again quoting the Cambridge History, "With all the realism of his situations, with all the genuineness of his characters, he was rather a producer of plays for a particular theatrical troupe than a writer of drama. That his comic characters generally stand in organic relation to the play is one of his chief merits. Of his many pieces (about 70 or 80) only a score or so have been published." They single out as some of his best Mirele Efros, Got, Mentsh un Tayvl (God, Man, and Devil, based on Goethe's Faust), and Der Umbakanter (The Unknown).

Partial list of works
Some of these plays may have earlier dates than indicated: it is possible that sources are referring to publication dates or revivals.
 Siberia, 1891
 Der pogrom in rusland (The Pogrom in Russia), 1892
 Tsvey veltn, oder Der groyser sotsialist (Two Worlds, or The Great Socialist). According to B. Gorin, 1892; according to Z. Zylbercweig, 1896
 Der yidisher kenig lir (The Jewish King Lear), 1892
 Der vilder mentsh (The Wild Man), 1893
 Captain Dreyfus; Pogrom, 1893
 "Di litvishe brider lurie" (The Lurie Brothers from Lithuania), 1894
 Zelig itzik, der fidler, free adaptation of Schiller's Intrigue and Love (Kabal und Liebe)
 "Der folks faynd" (An Enemy of the People), an adaptation from Henrik Ibsen, 1896
 Medea: a historishe tragedye, adapted from Franz Grillparzer, no later than 1897
 Mirele Efros, oder di yidishe kenigin lir (Mirele Efros or the Jewish Queen Lear), 1898
 Di shkhite (The Slaughter — the title refers to ritual slaughter, in accord with Kosher laws), 1899
 Shloime khokhem (Solomon the Wise, Solomon Kaus), 1899-1900
 Di shvue (The Oath), 1900
 Got, mentsh un tayvl (God, Man, and Devil), 1900
 Safo (Sappho), 1900
 Der momzer (The Bastard), a reworking of Victor Hugo's Lucrezia de Borgia, 1901
 Di makht fun finsternish, translation of  The Power of Darkness by Leo Tolstoy 1902; Gorin lists as 1905
 Di Kreytser sonata (The Kreutzer Sonata), 1902
 Khasye di yesoyme (Khasia the orphan), 1903
 Der emes or  Die varhayt (The Truth), 1903
 Ta'ares-hamishpokhe (Family Purity), 1904
 Di emese kraft (The True Power), 1904
 Tkhies-hameysim (Resurrection), adapted from the Tolstoy novel, 1904
 Elisha Ben Abuyah, 1906
 Der unbekanter (The Stranger), 1905
 Der meturef (The Worthless), 1905
 Der fremder (The Foreigner), 1906
 On a heym (Homeless), 1907
 Di sheyne Miryam, no later than 1908
 Dementia Americana, 1908
 Dovid'l meshoyrer (David the Choir Singer), 1907

Footnotes

Further reading
 Joel Berkowitz, Shakespeare on the American Yiddish Stage.  Iowa City: University of Iowa Press, 2002
 Melech Epstein, Profiles of Eleven: Profiles of Eleven Men Who Guided the Destiny of an Immigrant Society and Stimulated Social Consciousness Among the American People. Detroit: Wayne State University Press, 1965
 
 Beth Kaplan, Finding the Jewish Shakespeare: The Life and Legacy of Jacob Gordin, University of Syracuse Press, 2007
 Lulla Rosenfeld, "The Yiddish Idol," New York Times Magazine, June 12, 1977, p. 32 ff. (in the New York Times digital archive edition, p. 205-207, 210). The article is an excerpt from Rosenfeld's book Bright Star of Exile: Jakob Adler and the Yiddish Theatre (New York: Crowell, 1977).
 Zalmen Zylbercweig (ed.), "Gordin, Yankev," in Leksikon fun yidishn teater, vol. 1, Farlag "Elisheve," New York, 1931, p. 392–461

1853 births
1909 deaths
People from Myrhorod
People from Poltava Governorate
Ukrainian Jews
Emigrants from the Russian Empire to the United States
American people of Ukrainian-Jewish descent
Bundists
Yiddish-language playwrights
Jewish dramatists and playwrights
Jewish American dramatists and playwrights
19th-century American dramatists and playwrights